The Saudi Arabian Trade Office in Taipei (Arabic: المكتب التجاري العربي السعودي في تايبيه Al-Maktab at-Tijārī al-ʻArabī as-Saʻūdī fī Taybei) represents the interests of Saudi Arabia in Taiwan in the absence of formal diplomatic relations, functioning as a de facto embassy.

History
Until 1990, Saudi Arabia had diplomatic relations with Taiwan as the Republic of China, and had an embassy in Taipei. However, in that year, the kingdom established official diplomatic ties with the People's Republic of China and broke them off with Taiwan, although relations were continued through each side's respective representative office.

Its counterpart is the Taipei Economic and Cultural Representative Office in the Kingdom of Saudi Arabia in Riyadh. Both offices were set up in 1991, following the signing of a memorandum six months after the severing of diplomatic relations.
 
The Office is headed by Rafat Ahmed Khaleel Al Sayed, and was formerly by Talat Ibrahim Muslimani.

See also
 Saudi Arabia–Taiwan relations
 List of diplomatic missions in Taiwan
 List of diplomatic missions of Saudi Arabia

References

External links
 

Taipei
Representative Offices in Taipei
Saudi Arabia–Taiwan relations